Proclaim! is a Catholic news and discussion broadcast aired on Fox affiliate WWCP-TV in the Johnstown/Altoona/State College PA Television Market since December 2, 2001. They also produce Johnstown-Altoona Diocese Mass live from St. John Gualbert Cathedral in Johnstown. The Mass telecast has aired on local television since September 11, 1988. It is the only locally produced Catholic television Mass in the United States to air live on commercial broadcast television on a weekly basis. The Proclaim! news show airs Sundays at 5:30 AM & 10:30 AM, followed by the Live Mass at 11:00 AM. (The mass is replayed on local public-access television at 9:00 PM)

Proclaim! discusses news from in and around the Roman Catholic Diocese of Altoona-Johnstown as well as national and international religious based stories from Fox News National. The news segments are hosted by Tony DeGol, Director of Communications for The Altoona-Johnstown Diocese. A separate segment, "Keeping the Faith", is hosted by  Bishop Mark Bartchak of The Altoona-Johnstown Diocese.

History
The St. John Gualbert Television Ministry dates back to 1988 when Deacon John Sroka pitched the idea of a live hour-long mass and launched it on Public-access television in Johnstown. Over time, the church underwent renovations to make the Cathedral better suited for the Mass telecast. WWCP-TV picked up the broadcast in 2001, allowing the entire television market to see the broadcast and witness the creation of the Proclaim! news show.  The mass continues to be one of the only produced Mass broadcasts to air live every Sunday in the United States on television.

Proclaim! raises most of its funds through public support by way of their "Minute-A-Month" program. They also raise funds from parish and commercial sponsorship.

Proclaim! Segments

Teen Talk
The segment revolves around a wide variety of issues that matter to teens and how they related to the Catholic Church.

Teen Talk was originally hosted by Aaron Lemmon and Mindy Hartfiel when Proclaim! began in December 2001.  Mindy left the show soon after, and Aaron hosted solo until he went on to attend Boston College in 2004. Mike Amenti took over soon afterwards. Proclaim! and Teen Talk was granted an interview with Aaron Carter at the Palace Theater in 2005. However, this was the last produced episode of the original Teen Talk as the segment would go on hiatus until August 2007 when Proclaim! was granted an interview with The Jonas Brothers moderated by Crispin Havener. Aaron Lemmon returned for a 6 week mini-series the following month with Nick Gregorchik, discussing his study abroad experiences in Australia. Following the success of the interview and the mini-series, Teen Talk returned full-time on November 11, 2007, with Crispin Havener. In August, 2009, Proclaim! announced that Crispin would resign as Teen Talk's host by month's end, with Adam Wood and Samantha Slezak taking over as co-hosts. Crispin aired his last show on August 23. Adam and Samantha took over August 30.

Keeping The Faith
Bishop Mark L. Bartchak hosts this segment, and is joined by a wide variety of guests to discuss matters of theology, faith, ministry, and service.

Guests have included church and school leaders, as well as heads of charities, and leaders of upcoming events in the diocese. Bishop Bartchak also has church parishioners from local parishes talk about their church and faith life. The bishop appears as a guest once a month to discuss church issues and upcoming events, with the current Teen Talk hosts serving as the interviewer.

Bishop Joseph V. Adamec hosted the segment during his time serving the diocese under the title Can We Talk? from Proclaim's premier until his retirement in April, 2011.

Live Diocese Mass
WWCP-TV continues to air the Live Mass as the Johnstown-Altoona Diocese Mass (Also known as The Catholic Mass from St. John Gaulbert Cathedral) at 11:00 AM each Sunday.  The Mass continues to be produced by an all-volunteer television crew that makes up the Proclaim! TV Ministry, which is led by Executive Producer Dino Tessari. The Mass is celebrated by priests from local parishes, as well as  St. John Gaulbert's Rev. Chuck Bridges. Bishop Bartchak presides over the Mass on Easter Sunday, Christmas, and other special occasions.

External links
 Proclaim! TV Ministry Website From The Diocese Website

Religious mass media in the United States
Television shows about Catholicism
American public access television shows